John Catron (January 7, 1786 – May 30, 1865) was an American jurist who served as an Associate Justice of the Supreme Court of the United States from 1837 to 1865, during the Taney Court.

Early and family life
Little is known of Catron's early life, other than that all of his grandparents emigrated from Germany to Virginia, as part of the extensive emigration of Swiss and Germans from Hesse and the Palatinate due to wars, and economic and religious insecurity in the area. His father, Peter (Catron) Kettering, had immigrated as a child with his parents from Mittelbrun in the German Palatinate and settled in Montgomery County (later Wythe County). His mother was Maria Elizabetha Houck, whose parents had settled in Virginia after emigrating from the Palatinate by way of Pennsylvania. His only sibling, Mary, later married Thomas Swift and moved to Missouri and, ultimately, Oregon.  John Catron was a second cousin to Thomas Benton Catron, who later became one of the first senators to represent the state of New Mexico.  Catron's father had served in Captain William Doack's militia company from Montgomery County during the Revolutionary War.

The family relocated to Kentucky in the first years of the 19th century.  Catron served in the War of 1812 under Andrew Jackson.  He read law and was admitted to the Tennessee bar in 1815. He married Matilda Childress, sister of George C. Childress who was one of the political leaders of the Texas Republic and chaired the committee that drafted the Constitution of the Republic of Texas.  John and Mathilda Catron had no children.

A slaveholder all his adult life, Catron had a relationship with Sally, a Tennessee slave in her 30s who had a laundry in Nashville and was held by the Thomas family. Catron fathered her third mixed-race son, whom she named James P. Thomas. In his lifetime, Catron gave Thomas 25 cents. James was born into slavery but when he was six, his mother effectively bought his freedom. She was unable to gain full manumission for him then, but he gained an education and successfully built a business as a barber in Nashville. Because of his achievements, in 1851 he gained manumission as well as permission from the Tennessee legislature to stay in the state. Later he owned property in St. Louis, Missouri valued at $250,000.  Thomas was Catron's only known child.

Law practice
Catron was in private legal practice in Sparta in the Cumberland Mountains of Tennessee from 1815 to 1818, while simultaneously serving as a prosecuting attorney of that city. He established a land law practice in Nashville in 1818, in which he continued until 1824. From 1824 to 1834, Catron served on the Tennessee Supreme Court of Errors and Appeals, being elevated to Chief Justice of that court in 1831.  In 1834, the Tennessee state legislature abolished the chief justice position, and Catron retired and returned to private practice in Nashville. During the election of 1836, Catron directed Martin Van Buren's presidential campaign in Tennessee against native son Hugh Lawson White.

Supreme Court tenure
The number of seats on the Supreme Court was expanded from seven to nine in 1837, as a result of the Eighth and Ninth Circuits Act. This allowed President Andrew Jackson the opportunity to appoint two new justices, which he did on March 3, 1837, his last full day in office. The newly seated Senate of the 25th Congress confirmed Catron's nomination five days later by a vote of 28–15. The nominee for the other seat, William Smith, was also confirmed, but he subsequently declined to serve. Catron took the judicial oath on May 1, 1837, and served for 28 years, until his death in May 1865.

Catron supported slavery and sided with the majority in the Dred Scott v. Sandford case (exchanging letters with president-elect James Buchanan in February 1857).  However, he opposed secession and urged Tennessee to remain with the Union. For a brief time after Tennessee seceded from the Union but prior to Nashville being occupied by Federal troops, Catron left his residence in Nashville and temporarily lived in Louisville, Kentucky.

While he wrote few opinions, it is still possible to decipher his stance on certain political issues and determine his importance to the court. John Catron's political views primarily coincided with the views of his fellow Tennessean Andrew Jackson. Just as Jackson opposed the idea of the national bank, Catron also became an outspoken critic of the national bank. This view coincides with his political view on corporations. While Catron ultimately believed that corporate power could threaten the livelihoods of American citizens, his views were not always this way. During his early years on the Court, particularly in the case of Bank of Augusta v. Earle (1839), Catron actually concurred with the majority and agreed with the idea that corporations had the ability to conduct business nationwide. The Justices ruled in Bank of Augusta that a state could exclude a foreign corporation from doing business within that state, but, that the state would have to do so explicitly.

This case raised the issue of whether or not a corporate charter constituted a contract between the state and the bank and therefore could not be repealed due to the Contract Clause in Article 1, Section 10 of the Constitution. The Piqua Branch of the State Bank of Ohio's original charter granted an exemption from state taxation. However, a new legislature was attempting to repeal this exemption and impose a tax on the bank. The majority of the Court ruled in favor of the charter, citing the Contract clause. John Catron, along with Justices Campbell and Daniel, however, dissented. In his dissent, Catron argued, "The sovereign political power is not the subject of contract so as to be vested in an irrepealable charter of incorporation, and taken away from, and placed beyond the reach of, future legislatures." With this statement, Catron argued against the power of corporations and for the power of the federal government. Catron made the stance that political power was not only sovereign but that it also was not to be overruled by a contract, especially a corporate charter. Essentially Catron argued that in this case, corporate power exceeded federal power. Because John Catron was a Jacksonian, he felt the American Union should always be the most powerful entity within the United States and therefore dissented in this case which he saw as granting more power to corporations than to the federal government. Catron argued that because of this ruling, corporations could overrule the government as long as a contract was present. This case primarily dealt with the power to tax corporations, but took on bigger-picture questions such as the role of corporations in American society and whether they had begun to possess more power than the states had originally granted them. Catron again dissented from the majority and re-stated his Jacksonian beliefs when he voiced his concern about "the vast amount of property, power, and exclusive benefits, prejudicial to other classes of society that are vested in and held by these numerous bodies of associated wealth." Catron also stated "that a different doctrine would tend to sap and eventually might destroy the state constitutions and governments" in his dissent when referring to the power that corporate charters and contracts could have over the United States government.

Despite Catron's opinion in the Dred Scott v. Sandford case and his pro-slavery stance, Catron resented the secession of his home state of Tennessee because he felt the American Union should be preserved at all costs, a reflection of his Jacksonian views. Following President Abraham Lincoln's inauguration, Catron left to "ride circuit" in the states of Missouri, Tennessee, and Kentucky. However, when Catron attempted to return to Nashville to perform his circuit duties, he was told that his very life could be in danger due to his views. Catron was forced to flee the state of Tennessee and reside permanently in Louisville, Kentucky, away from his wife and friends, who sympathized with the Confederacy. Catron's stance on the southern rebels was to "punish treason and will." This belief was present in his ruling in United States v. Republican Banner Officers (C.C.D. Tenn. 1863). This case raised the issue of whether non-personal property could be confiscated due to the federal Confiscation Act of 1861. The Republican Banner was a newspaper that at the time, was spreading very anti-Union and pro-Confederacy propaganda throughout the South. The employees of the Banner argued that because the newspaper was not a personal property, it could not be confiscated.  In this case, Catron ruled that the Act authorized the confiscation. Catron argued that when, "there being then a formidable rebellion in progress, the intention of Congress in enacting this law must have been to deter persons from so using and employing their property as to aid and promote the insurrection.". Even to the end of his legal and judicial career, Catron held fast to his protection of the rights of states and his stance on preserving the Union whatever the cost.

Death
Catron died on May 30, 1865, at the age of 79. He is interred at Nashville's Mount Olivet Cemetery.

After Catron's death, Congress eliminated his seat from the Court under the Judicial Circuits Act of 1866 as a way to prevent President Andrew Johnson from appointing any justices.

Legacy and honors
John Catron was an outspoken critic of the national bank, an advocate for federal power over corporate power, and a pro-Union, pro-slavery supporter. Many of his beliefs stemmed from the beliefs of his friend and battlefield leader, Andrew Jackson. Catron fought against corporations of accumulated wealth and privilege and for the rights of citizens. He remained true to his pro-slavery stance in the most important case the Supreme Court had ever seen until that point, Dred Scott v. Sandford. Despite his pro-slavery stance, Catron was a strong advocate for the Union and remained steadfast to this view, even leaving his wife and friends to help in the preservation of the United States. Ultimately, John Catron's most important contribution to the Supreme Court of the United States was his loyalty to the Constitution and his undying support of the Federal Union, despite the political costs.

During World War II the Liberty ship  was built in Brunswick, Georgia, and named in his honor.

See also
List of justices of the Supreme Court of the United States

References

 John Catron, Oyez-Supreme Court Multimedia.
 
 Kegley, Mary B. "Militia of Montgomery County, Virginia 1777-1790," Kegley Books, (1974)
 Westphall, Victor.  "Thomas Benton Catron and His Era," University of Arizona Press(1973)

Further reading
 
 

1786 births
1865 deaths
19th-century American judges
American people of German descent
United States Army personnel of the War of 1812
American Presbyterians
Chief Justices of the Tennessee Supreme Court
People from Sparta, Tennessee
People from Wythe County, Virginia
Tennessee Democrats
Justices of the Tennessee Supreme Court
United States Army soldiers
United States federal judges appointed by Andrew Jackson
Justices of the Supreme Court of the United States
United States federal judges admitted to the practice of law by reading law
Burials at Mount Olivet Cemetery (Nashville)
American slave owners
American white supremacists